White Wing may refer to:

 AEA White Wing, an experimental aircraft
 Operation White Wing, a battle of the Vietnam War

See also

 White Wings
 White-winged (disambiguation)
 Whitewing (disambiguation)
 Whitewings